Sebastian Szimayer (born 15 May 1990) is a German footballer who plays for FC UNA Strassen.

References

External links

1990 births
Living people
German footballers
SV Wehen Wiesbaden players
SG Sonnenhof Großaspach players
SV Waldhof Mannheim players
SpVgg Neckarelz players
FC Rot-Weiß Erfurt players
SV Eintracht Trier 05 players
KSV Hessen Kassel players
Racing FC Union Luxembourg players
Luxembourg National Division players
3. Liga players
Regionalliga players
Association football forwards
FC UNA Strassen players
Sportspeople from Heilbronn
Footballers from Baden-Württemberg